Krähenbach may refer to:

Krähenbach (Danube), a river of Baden-Württemberg, Germany, tributary of the Danube
Krähenbach (Kammel), a river of Bavaria, Germany, tributary of the Kammel